Koiak 20 - Coptic Calendar - Koiak 22

The twenty-first day of the Coptic month of Koiak, the fourth month of the Coptic year. On a common year, this day corresponds to December 17, of the Julian Calendar, and December 30, of the Gregorian Calendar. This day falls in the Coptic season of Peret, the season of emergence. This day falls in the Nativity Fast.

Commemorations

Feasts 

 Monthly commemoration of the Virgin Mary, the Theotokos

Saints 

 The martyrdom of Saint Barnabas, one of the Seventy Apostles

References 

Days of the Coptic calendar